Zevadu (also Romanized as Zevādū) is a village in Jask Rural District, in the Central District of Jask County, Hormozgan Province, Iran. At the 2006 census, its population was 73, in 19 families.

References 

Populated places in Jask County